There is great variety in dance in the Netherlands. 
The traditional dance is the Dutch folk dance; however, this is hardly practiced anymore. Many Dutch practise ballroom dancing, but also tango has a large following.

Many young girls start their dancing career with classical ballet and jazz dance.

Only a few dances are invented by the Dutch. Most of the Folk Dances are Scottish in origin. The Dutch are inventors of Hakken, which was mainly danced in the Hardcore techno and Gabber scene in the 1990s. Jumpen, which was invented in Belgium, developed further in the Netherlands. The Netherlands is one of the leading countries in the Brazilian version of zouk (a successor to lambada).

The reality show and competition Dancing with the Stars has popularized Ballroom dancing and the Dutch version of So You Think You Can Dance helps the popularity of modern dance in the Netherlands. Ice dance has been popularised by the TV shows Dancing on Ice and Sterren Dansen Op Het IJs.

Ballet, Modern and Contemporary Dance

Choreographers
Annabelle Lopez Ochoa
Emio Greco
Hans van Manen
Itzik Galili
Nicole Beutler
Polly Cuninghame
Rudi van Dantzig

Dancers

 Alexandra Radius
 Benjamin Feliksdal
 Hannie van Leeuwen
Hans van Manen
 Jaap Flier
 Louis van Amstel
 Marcus van Teijlingen
 Mata Hari
 Milou Nuyens
Polly Cuninghame
 Romy Haag
 Rudi van Dantzig
 Sonia Gaskell

Companies
Het Nationale Ballet
De Stilte
ICKamsterdam
Introdans
Nederlands Dans Theater
Nicole Beutler Projects
Scapino Ballet

Dance education
AHK Amsterdamse Hogeschool voor de Kunsten
Codarts Rotterdamse Dansacademie
Fontys Dansacademie Tilburg
ArtEZ Dansacademie Arnhem

Festivals
Hollands Dance Festival
Julidans
Nederlands Dans Dagen (Dutch Dance Days)
Stilte Festival